Phaedropsis is a genus of moths of the family Crambidae.

Species
Phaedropsis alitemeralis (Dyar, 1914)
Phaedropsis beckeri Munroe, 1995
Phaedropsis bipunctalis (Hampson, 1895)
Phaedropsis calanticalis (Druce, 1895)
Phaedropsis chromalis (Guenée, 1854)
Phaedropsis collustralis (Möschler, 1886)
Phaedropsis domingalis (Schaus, 1920)
Phaedropsis flavipennis (Kaye, 1901)
Phaedropsis fuscicostalis (Hampson, 1895)
Phaedropsis glutalis (Möschler, 1881)
Phaedropsis hecalialis (Walker, 1859)
Phaedropsis illepidalis (Herrich-Schäffer, 1871)
Phaedropsis illustralis (Dognin, 1913)
Phaedropsis impeditalis (Herrich-Schäffer, 1871)
Phaedropsis leialis (Dognin, 1906)
Phaedropsis maritzalis (Schaus, 1920)
Phaedropsis meropialis (Möschler, 1886)
Phaedropsis placendalis (Möschler, 1890)
Phaedropsis principaloides (Möschler, 1890)
Phaedropsis principialis (Lederer, 1863)
Phaedropsis simplalis (Guenée, 1854)
Phaedropsis stictigramma (Hampson, 1912)
Phaedropsis strigilalis (Hampson, 1899)
Phaedropsis venadialis (Schaus, 1920)

References

Spilomelinae
Crambidae genera
Taxa named by William Warren (entomologist)